The Crew Module Atmospheric Re-entry Experiment (CARE) is an experimental test vehicle for the Indian Space Research Organisation's future ISRO orbital vehicle called Gaganyaan. It was launched successfully on 18 December 2014  from the Second Launch Pad of the Satish Dhawan Space Centre, by a GSLV Mk III designated by ISRO as the LVM 3X CARE mission. Cost of launch vehicle and CARE module was 140 crore and 15 crore.

Characteristics of the vehicle
The crew module was mounted upside-down inside the payload fairing of the GSLV Mk III. CARE was made of aluminium alloy and had a lift-off mass of 3,735 kg. Its diameter was 3100 mm and its height was 2698 mm. The module had an ablative thermal protection. The side panels were covered with Medium Density Ablative (MDA) tiles and the forward heat shield was made of carbon phenolic tiles. It was powered by batteries and was equipped with six liquid-propellant (MMH/MON3) 100 N thrusters.

Preliminary tests
A practice run of the recovery of crew module was done on 31 October 2014 with Indian Coast Guard ship ICGS Samudra Pahredar.

Mission description

CARE was launched on 18 December 2014 at 04:00 UTC. The crew module was separated at the intended height of 126 km and a speed of 5300 m/s. It entered a coast phase during which it performed three axis control manoeuvres in order to ensure zero degree angle of attack at reentry.

The ballistic reentry started from an altitude of about 80 km. At this altitude, the propulsion was shut down. The heat shield experienced temperatures around 1,000 degrees C and the capsule experienced deceleration of up to 13 g.

After the re-entry the vehicle performed a descent and splashdown during which an end-to-end validation of the parachute system was performed, including the demonstration of the apex cover separation and the parachute deployment in cluster configuration. The deployment sequence started when CARE had slowed to a speed of 233 m/s. The crew module carried three stages of parachutes, all of which came in pairs. First, both 2.3-meter diameter pilot parachutes came out, followed by the 6.2-meter drogue parachutes, which cut the capsule's velocity down to 50 m/s. Then both main parachutes were deployed at a height of about 5 km. These parachutes, each 31 meters in diameter, were the largest ever made in India.

CARE splashed down into the Bay of Bengal about 600 km from Port Blair in the Andaman Islands and about 1600 km from the Sriharikota launch site. Immediately afterwards the main parachutes were detached. CARE was recovered by the Indian Coast Guard  after tracking its signal beacon. The entire duration of the experiment from launch to splashdown was 20 minutes 43 seconds.

After recovery the module was brought to Chennai on 22 December 2014, from where it will be sent to the Satish Dhawan Space Centre for preliminary processing. The module will then be sent to Vikram Sarabhai Space Centre for further study and analysis.

Telemetry from ISRO 

Doordarshan's telecast of the GSLV Mk.III LVM3-X ascent and CARE module's ballistic descent showed screen displays of the following telemetry:

Industrial organisation
Hindustan Aeronautics Limited
Aerial Delivery Research and Development Establishment, Agra - parachute
Valeth Hightech Composites

See also
Space Capsule Recovery Experiment by ISRO, flown in 2007
Orbital Re-entry EXperiment by Japan, flown in 1994
Atmospheric Reentry Demonstrator (A suborbital reentry test vehicle built by Aérospatiale of France for the European Space Agency and flown on the third Ariane 5 flight on October 21, 1998)
Space Rider, Europe's future robotic spaceplane
SpaceX Starship, reusable crewed spacecraft to be flown in 2020

References

Indian Space Research Organisation
Suborbital spaceflight
2014 in spaceflight
2014 in India
Spacecraft launched by GSLV rockets
Test spaceflights